Legazpi is a station on Line 3 and Line 6 of the Madrid Metro. It is located in Zone A.

Carlos Palomino was murdered at the station in 2007.

References 

Line 3 (Madrid Metro) stations
Line 6 (Madrid Metro) stations
Railway stations in Spain opened in 1951